Vaishali Jesrani (born 27 July 1981) is a women's cricketer who plays for the Oman national cricket team. In January 2020, she was named in the Oman women's national squad for the 2020 Qatar Women's T20I Triangular Series tournament which was also the international WT20I debut for Oman national team. She made her WT20I debut against Qatar on 17 January 2020. She is the captain of the Oman women's cricket team.

References

External links
 

1986 births
Living people
People from Muscat, Oman
Omani women cricketers
Oman women Twenty20 International cricketers
Women cricket captains
Indian expatriates in Oman